The Peaks Island Land Preserve (PILP) is a non-profit organization concerned with conserving natural land on Peaks Island, Maine for public use. It was founded in 1994 to preserve Battery Steele, an historic United States military fortification built on Peaks Island during World War II. After acquiring Battery Steele, PILP began to obtain land through purchase and donation across the island. The PILP held its first post-incorporation meeting in 1995 at the Fifth Maine Regiment Community Center.

References

External links
 Peaks Island Land Preserve

Peaks Island, Maine
Non-profit organizations based in Maine
Organizations established in 1993
Land trusts in the United States
1993 establishments in Maine